Humeromaculatus quinquefasciatus is a species of beetle in the family Cerambycidae. It was described by Laporte de Castelnau and Gory in 1836.

References

Beetles described in 1836